Tiller is a former municipality in the old Sør-Trøndelag county, Norway. The  municipality of Tiller existed from 1899 until its dissolution in 1964. The municipality encompassed part of the south-central part of what is now the municipality of Trondheim in Trøndelag county. The municipality was generally located between the river Nidelva in the east and the Dovrebanen railway line. The administrative centre was located at Heimdal, on the western edge of the municipality. The local Tiller Church was built shortly after the creation of the municipality (1901) to serve its residents.

History

The municipality of Tiller was established on 1 January 1899 when the northwestern part of the municipality of Klæbu was split off to form a separate municipality. Initially, Tiller had a population of 533. During the 1960s, there were many municipal mergers across Norway due to the work of the Schei Committee. On 1 January 1964, the neighboring municipalities of Byneset (population: 2,049), Leinstrand (population: 4,193), Strinda (population: 44,600), Tiller (population: 3,595), and the city of Trondheim (population: 56,982) were merged to form the new urban municipality of Trondheim which would have a total population of 111,419.

Government
All municipalities in Norway, including Tiller, are responsible for primary education (through 10th grade), outpatient health services, senior citizen services, unemployment and other social services, zoning, economic development, and municipal roads. The municipality is governed by a municipal council of elected representatives, which in turn elects a mayor.

Municipal council
The municipal council  of Tiller was made up of 19 representatives that were elected to four year terms. The party breakdown of the final municipal council was as follows:

See also
List of former municipalities of Norway

References

Former municipalities of Norway
Geography of Trondheim
1899 establishments in Norway
1964 disestablishments in Norway
Populated places disestablished in 1964
Populated places established in 1899